Marlon Pascua Cerrato served as the Defense Minister of Honduras from 2010 to 2014.

References

Year of birth missing (living people)
Living people
Defence ministers of Honduras